The 1993 Big Eight Conference men's basketball tournament was held March 12–14 at Kemper Arena in Kansas City, Missouri.

Seventh-seeded Missouri defeated #5 seed Kansas State in the championship game, 68–56, to earn the conference's automatic bid to the 1993 NCAA tournament.

Bracket

References

Tournament
Big Eight Conference men's basketball tournament
Big Eight Conference men's basketball tournament
Big Eight Conference men's basketball tournament